was a Japanese astrophysicist. Hayashi tracks on the Hertzsprung–Russell diagram are named after him.

Hayashi was born in Kyoto and enrolled at the Imperial University of Tokyo in 1940, earning his BSc in Physics after 2½ years, in 1942.  He was conscripted into the navy and, after the war ended, joined the group of Hideki Yukawa at Kyoto University.  He was appointed a professor at Kyoto University in 1957.

He made additions to the Big Bang nucleosynthesis model that built upon the work of the classic Alpher–Bethe–Gamow paper.
Probably his most famous work was the astrophysical calculations that led to the Hayashi tracks of star formation, and the Hayashi limit that puts a limit on star radius.
He was also involved in the early study of brown dwarfs, some of the smallest stars formed.

He retired in 1984 and died from pneumonia at a Kyoto hospital on February 28, 2010.

Awards and honours

References

External links
 Kyoto Prize biography page
 Bruce Medal page

1920 births
2010 deaths
20th-century Japanese astronomers
Japanese astrophysicists
Kyoto laureates in Basic Sciences
Academic staff of Kyoto University
University of Tokyo alumni
Kyoto University alumni
Foreign associates of the National Academy of Sciences
Deaths from pneumonia in Japan
Recipients of the Order of Culture
Laureates of the Imperial Prize